Lê Hạ Anh (born 31 August 1995 in Gia Lai Province) is a Vietnamese actress.

Life and career
Lê Hạ Anh was born in Pleiku city, Gia Lai Province, Vietnam on August 31, 1995. She won Fashion Icon 2011 (Ngôi sao thời trang 2011). She played cameo role in series Tiệm bánh Hoàng tử bé, and leading role in its sequel Tiệm bánh Hoàng tử bé 2. Hạ Anh has a good singing voice, but she didn't pursue a singing career, she only wants to be an actress. She starred in several movies and television films. She has also appeared in many television shows.

Filmography
Tiệm bánh Hoàng tử bé
Những thiên thần nhanh nhạy
Cô nàng tươi tắn
Tiệm bánh Hoàng tử bé 2
14 ngày đấu trí
Học viện teen cứng
Khi yêu đừng vội
Gái già lắm chiêu
Máu chảy về tim
Lối thoát
Cười lên vợ ơi
Cô gái đến từ hôm qua - The Girl from Yesterday
Yêu đi, đừng sợ! - Kiss and Spell
Cả một đời ân oán 2
Trường học Bá Vương
Không cần soái ca 
Bí mật quý ông
Tình mẫu tử
Đánh cắp giấc mơ

References

External links

1995 births
Living people
Vietnamese film actresses
Vietnamese television actresses
People from Gia Lai Province
21st-century Vietnamese women